Krishan  Mohan (28 November 1922 – 2004) was an Indian Urdu poet who gained prominence after India gained independence from the British Raj.

Mohan was the takhallus of Krishan Lal Bhatia who was born in Sialkot, British India. His father, Ganpat Rai Bhatia, was an advocate; post partition of British India he practiced law in the District Courts of Meerut. Ganpat Rai was also an Urdu poet; his takhallus was Shakir.

After completing his school studies Krishan Mohan obtained his B.A. (Hons.) degrees separately in English and in Persian as a student of Murray College, Sialkot, where he was also the editor of the college house magazine. Later on he obtained his M.A. degree in English Literature as a student of Government College, Lahore.

After partition of British India his family moved to Karnal where Krishan Mohan found temporary employment as a welfare officer. Thereafter, he worked as sub-editor and assistant editor of All India Radio's publication Aawaaz at Lucknow and Delhi, and then as a journalist with the Press Information Bureau before joining the Indian Revenue Service as an Income Tax Officer.

He died in Delhi, aged 82 years. His children are Meera Bhatia , Neera Bhatia and Rohit Bhatia. Meera Bhatia is an advocate and does cases in supreme court and high court and was standing counsel criminal for Delhi , Haryana and Senior Counsel UOI. She has done LLB from Delhi University. Neera Bhatia was a senior teacher at DPS RK.PURAM New Delhi, she was a PGT teacher. She obtained her masters degree from Delhi University. Rohit Bhatia is his son. Krishna Mohan’s grandchildren are Abhinav Kalra , Vishakha Bhatia, Abhimanyu Kalra and Anandit Thakur.

Literary life
 

Krishan Mohan was a popular and a prolific writer who after 1947 dominated Delhi’s that particular Urdu stage which was graced by stalwarts – Pandit Harichand Akhtar, Arsh Malsiani, Jagan Nath Azad, Gopal Mittal, Naresh Kumar Shad, Bismil Saeedi, Rana Jaggi, Ram Krishan Mushtar, Talib Chakwali and Bakshi Akhtar Amritsari.

While adhering to the classical style Krishan Mohan did not hesitate to experiment, at times over- reaching the extreme thresh-holds of imagination and thought. His ghazals set in the traditional mode are thoughtful and thought-provoking, and for his nazms he searched for and found new ideas and expressions.

Bibliography

Urdu poetry (in Urdu script):
 Shabnam shabnam
 Dil e Naadaan
 Tamaashaaii
 Ghazaal
 Nigaah e naaz
 Aahang e watan
 Konpal konpal
 Bairaagii bhanwaraa
 Shirazah e mizgaan

Urdu poetry (in Hindi script):
 Roopras
 Dhoop meri kaamnaa ki
 Pyaas meri kaamnaa ki

References

1922 births
2004 deaths
People from Sialkot
Urdu-language poets from India
Hindu poets
Government College University, Lahore alumni
Indian Revenue Service officers
20th-century Indian poets
Indian male poets
20th-century Indian male writers